Newton Public Schools is a school district in Newton, Massachusetts, United States. The district features four middle schools that lead into two high schools.

Schools 
The Newton Public Schools are organized into an elementary school (K–5), middle school (6–8), and high school (9–12) arrangement. There was a projected enrollment of 11,237 students for FY06.

Primary schools 
Angier Elementary School
Bowen Elementary School
Burr Elementary School
Cabot Elementary School
Countryside Elementary School
Franklin Elementary School
Horace Mann Elementary School
Lincoln-Eliot Elementary School
Mason-Rice Elementary School
Memorial Spaulding Elementary School
Peirce Elementary School
Underwood Elementary School
Ward Elementary School
Williams Elementary School
Zervas Elementary School

Middle schools 
Charles E. Brown
Oak Hill
Bigelow
F.A. Day

High schools 
Newton North High School
Newton South High School

Controversies

Textbook controversy 
In October 2011, a controversy occurred over the content of a textbook used in World History classes throughout the district which contained content that was allegedly anti-Semitic. The textbook was later removed from the curriculum.

Superintendent plagiarism 
In July 2014, The Lion's Roar, the student newspaper of Newton South High School, accused Superintendent David Fleishman of using parts of a speech by Governor Deval Patrick without credit. The accusations were levied by two members of the class of 2014. After admitting that he had failed to cite the governor, the Newton School Committee fined Fleishman one week's pay of his $250,000 salary.

Violations of Massachusetts' Open Meeting Law 
On December 19, 2014 the Massachusetts Attorney General found that the Newton Public Schools and School Committee Chair Matthew Hills had committed eight violations of the state's Open Meeting Law in June and July 2014. The violations occurred in connection with the plagiarism by Newton Superintendent David Fleishman. No sanctions were imposed on Hills other than reviewing the law.

References

External links

 Newton Public Schools official website

School districts in Massachusetts